Legislative elections were held for the National Assembly of People's Power, Cuba's national legislature, on 19 January 2003. The vote is an endorsement of pre-selected candidates rather than a choice between rivals. Half of the candidates are nominated at public meetings before gaining approval from electoral committees, while the other half are nominated by official mass organisations (such as trade unions, farmers organisations and Students' unions).

The government claims that the election represents a show of popular support, but its critics have attributed the result instead to fear or apathy on the part of those who do not support the government. They suspect that the result may reflect electoral engineering (in constituencies known to have a high proportion of voters who are more inclined to express dissatisfaction by registering blank or spoiled votes, the candidates offered tend to be highly respected local figures not associated closely with the government), the lack of independent supervision of the count or the barrage of propaganda. They also point out that the system of selection of candidates effectively excludes any truly independent voices.

In the run-up to the election, U.S. President George W. Bush described the process as "a fraud and a sham" adding "If Cuba's government takes all the necessary steps to ensure that the 2003 elections are certifiably free and fair, and if Cuba also begins to adopt meaningful market-based reforms, then, and only then, will I work with the United States Congress to ease the ban on trade and travel".

Results

Results of notable candidates

See also

Cuba and democracy

References

External links
 2003 national and state elections

2003
2003 in Cuba
2003 elections in the Caribbean
Single-candidate elections
January 2003 events in North America